Kuiterichthys furcipilis, the rough anglerfish, is a species of frogfish endemic to the coastal waters of southern Australia and Tasmania. It grows to a length of  TL.

References

Antennariidae
Fish described in 1817
Taxa named by Georges Cuvier